Mark Stewart Watson (born 8 September 1970) is a Canadian former professional soccer player who works as Technical Director (GM) at Minnesota United FC. A former defender, Watson is the sixth most-capped player in the history of the Canada national team.

Club career
Watson spent 18 years as a professional soccer player. He spent three seasons with Watford FC of the English Championship from 1993 to 1995 and then joined Major League Soccer for its inaugural season in 1996. He split that first MLS season between the New England Revolution and Columbus Crew. Watson returned to MLS in 2001 with D.C. United after stops with the Seattle Sounders, Oxford United and Oldham Athletic.

International career
For Canada, Watson has appeared 78 times for the 'A' national team during a 14-year span. He has played in four World Cup qualifying campaigns. and on the 2000 CONCACAF Gold Cup side that won the tournament. Watson scored the winning goal for Canada in the semi-final of the 2000 Gold Cup, a match Canada won 1–0 over Trinidad and Tobago.

Coaching career 

Watson began his coaching career in 2004 with the Canadian national team system where he held assistant positions with the U-20 and senior squads. Watson served as assistant coach for Canada at the 2004 CONCACAF Men's Olympic Qualification Tournament and was an assistant when the team finished third in the same tournament in 2008. He also spent four seasons on the staff of his former playing club Charleston Battery as an assistant to Mike Anhaeuser from 2006 to 2009, helping lead Charleston to the final of the 2008 Lamar Hunt U.S. Open Cup.

After spending several seasons with San Jose Earthquakes as an assistant to his Canadian colleague Frank Yallop, Watson became the club's interim head coach on 7 June 2013 following Yallop's dismissal. Watson's first win as an MLS head coach came on 15 June 2013 against the Colorado Rapids at Dick's Sporting Goods Park. Watson was 11–5–3 during his 19 league games as interim coach, nearly rallying the Earthquakes to an MLS Cup Playoff berth. His mark 1.89 points per game was tops among all coaches after he took over. In addition to his success in MLS, Watson's squad advanced to the 2013-14 CONCACAF Champions League Quarterfinals by winning Group 5. Following these successes, on 30 October 2013 the Earthquakes announced that they had signed Watson to a permanent contract, thereby removing his interim status. After a disappointing season in which the Earthquakes failed to qualify for the playoffs, Watson was dismissed in late 2014.

He was hired as an assistant coach at Orlando City Soccer Club for their inaugural Major League Soccer season on 10 November 2014.

He was fired by Orlando City in July 2016.

On 18 January 2017, he was named assistant coach for Major League Soccer side Minnesota United FC.

Career statistics
Scores and results list Canada's goal tally first, score column indicates score after each Watson goal.

Coaching record

Honours
Charleston Battery
USL A-League: 2003

Canada
CONCACAF Gold Cup: 2000

Individual
Canadian Player of the Year: 1997
Canadian Soccer Hall of Fame: 2008

References

External links

 / Canada Soccer Hall of Fame
 
 

1970 births
Living people
Soccer players from Vancouver
1991 CONCACAF Gold Cup players
1993 CONCACAF Gold Cup players
2000 CONCACAF Gold Cup players
2001 FIFA Confederations Cup players
CONCACAF Gold Cup-winning players
Canada men's international soccer players
Canadian Soccer League (1987–1992) players
Canadian soccer players
Canada Soccer Hall of Fame inductees
Canadian people of Scottish descent
Charleston Battery players
Columbus Crew players
D.C. United players
Association football defenders
Hamilton Steelers (1981–1992) players
Major League Soccer players
Montreal Supra players
New England Revolution players
Allsvenskan players
Östers IF players
Oxford United F.C. players
Oldham Athletic A.F.C. players
Ottawa Intrepid players
Seattle Sounders (1994–2008) players
UBC Thunderbirds soccer players
University of British Columbia alumni
USL First Division players
Vancouver Whitecaps (1986–2010) players
Walsall F.C. players
Watford F.C. players
Canadian soccer coaches
San Jose Earthquakes coaches
A-League (1995–2004) players
San Jose Earthquakes non-playing staff
Orlando City SC non-playing staff
Minnesota United FC non-playing staff
Canadian expatriate soccer players
Canadian expatriate sportspeople in England
Expatriate footballers in England
Canadian expatriate sportspeople in the United States
Expatriate soccer players in the United States